Nephrotoma kigeziana is a species of fly from the family Tipulidae. The scientific name of this species was first published in 1956 by Alexander. This species can be found in the Afrotropical realm.

Subspecies
Nephrotoma kigeziana celator Alexander 1956
Nephrotoma kigeziana trigona Alexander 1956

References

Tipulidae
Taxa named by Charles Paul Alexander